Johan Reekers (born 28 December 1957, in Enschede) is a Dutch Paralympian who was born without legs. He was on the gold medal-winning Dutch sitting volleyball teams of 1980 and 1984. At the 1992 Summer Paralympics the team won silver. In 2002 he began handbiking. He competed for the Netherlands at the 2012 Summer Paralympics in cycling. This was his eighth Paralympics.

References

External links 
Johan Reekers website

Volleyball players at the 1980 Summer Paralympics
Volleyball players at the 1984 Summer Paralympics
Volleyball players at the 1992 Summer Paralympics
Cyclists at the 2004 Summer Paralympics
Paralympic gold medalists for the Netherlands
Paralympic silver medalists for the Netherlands
Paralympic bronze medalists for the Netherlands
Sportspeople from Enschede
1957 births
Living people
Medalists at the 1980 Summer Paralympics
Medalists at the 1984 Summer Paralympics
Medalists at the 1992 Summer Paralympics
Medalists at the 2004 Summer Paralympics
Dutch sitting volleyball players
Men's sitting volleyball players
Paralympic medalists in volleyball
20th-century Dutch people
21st-century Dutch people
Paralympic volleyball players of the Netherlands